Morcant Bulc was a Brythonic prince, probably a king, from Northern Britain, during the period between the end of the Roman Empire and the establishment of an English state during the early Middle Ages.

Morcant appears in a line of Men of the North from Old Welsh pedigrees. He was apparently preceded by his father, Cuncar, and succeeded by his son, Coledauc. Nothing else is known of him. However, historians have conjectured that his kingdom may have lain in Gododdin (Lothian), Alt Clut (Strathclyde) or Bryneich (Northumberland) in the late 6th century.

Morcant's first name is a form of Morgan. It is possible that he may therefore be identified with other Morgans found elsewhere in the Life of St. Kentigern  and the writings of Nennius:

 King Morken, apparently of Alt Clut, the opponent of St. Kentigern, during his early missionary work, who expelled the saint from his kingdom.
 King Morcant who almost single-handedly destroyed any hope the Britons of The Old North had of resisting the Anglian invaders during 6th century. He was part of a grand Brythonic alliance, along with King Urien of Rheged, King Riderch Hael of Alt Clut and King Gwallawc Marchawc Trin of Elmet. They were initially extremely successful in driving back the Angles from Bryneich territory, forcing them to vacate Din Guardi – possibly the capital - around 590 and besieging them on Ynys Metcaut (now called Lindisfarne). However, Morcant grew envious of the successes of Urien, and perhaps became uneasy about the prospects of a greatly empowered Rheged after the Angles had been defeated. Treacherously, he had Urien assassinated by a man called Llofan Llaf Difo and the alliance of the Britons of the North collapsed. The Angles broke out from their containment and retook most of the lands they had held before the war to expel them had begun.

References 
 Stephen J Murray, "Northumbria"

Northern Brythonic monarchs